Arsizio may refer to:

Brusino Arsizio, municipality in the canton of Ticino in Switzerland
Busto Arsizio, city and comune, in the province of Varese, Italy